HSwMS Vargen (Vg), Sw. meaning The Wolf, was the second boat of the Draken-class submarine of the Swedish Navy.

Construction and career 
HSwMS Vargen was launched on 20 May 1960 by Saab Kockums, Malmö and commissioned on 15 November 1961.

She was decommissioned in 1989 and scrapped later in Gävle.

Gallery

References 

Draken-class submarines
Ships built in Malmö
1960 ships